List of rivers in Arizona (U.S. state), sorted by name.

By drainage basin

This list is arranged by drainage basin, with respective tributaries indented under each larger stream's name.

Colorado River
Colorado River—(downstream-to-upstream)
Gila River—(downstream-to-upstream)
San Cristobal Wash
Tenmile Wash
Centennial Wash (Maricopa County)
Hassayampa River
Agua Fria River
Ironwood Wash
New River
Rock Springs Wash
Skunk Creek
Scatter Wash
Salt River
Arizona Canal
Grand Canal (Phoenix)
Verde River
Fossil Creek
Oak Creek
Granite Creek
Tonto Creek
White River
Black River
Santa Cruz River
Santa Rosa Wash
Cañada del Oro
Madera Canyon|Madera Creek
Brawley Wash
Altar Wash
Alambre Wash
Arivaca Creek
Rillito River
Tanque Verde Creek
Sabino Creek
Agua Caliente Wash
Molino Creek
Pantano Wash 
Rincon Creek
Ciénega Creek
Agua Verde Creek
Davidson Canyon
Mescal Arroyo
Sonoita Creek
Harshaw Creek
San Pedro River
Aravaipa Creek
Babocomari River
San Carlos River
San Simon River
Eagle Creek
San Francisco River
Blue River
Bill Williams River
Big Sandy River
Santa Maria River
Virgin River
Kanab Creek
Deer Creek
Tapeats Creek
Thunder River
Little Colorado River
Puerco River
Black Creek (Arizona)
Silver Creek
Zuni River
Paria River
Bonita Creek

Yaqui River
San Bernardino River; also known as Black Draw: enters Mexico as the Rio San Bernardino, where it feeds into the Bavispe River, and ultimately the Yaqui River.
 Guadalupe Canyon Creek, tributary to the San Bernardino River joins it at just below Dieciocho de Augusto, Sonora. 
 Whitewater Draw: originally considered the upper reach of the Rio de Agua Prieta, it enters Mexico as the head of Rio de Agua Prieta, which runs southward then southeast to join the Rio de San Bernardino, at La Junta de los Rios, Sonora, about 24.5 miles southeast of Douglas, Arizona.

Alphabetically
Agua Fria River
Agua Sal Creek
Aravaipa Creek
Babocomari River
Bar X Wash
Big Sandy River
Bill Williams River
Bis Ii Ah Wash
Black River
Blue River, Arizona
Bonita Creek
Bright Angel Creek
Cañada del Oro
Centennial Wash (Maricopa County)
Cienega Creek
Colorado River
Deer Creek
Eagle Creek
Fossil Creek
Gila River
Hassayampa River
Kanab Creek
Little Colorado River
Madera Canyon|Madera Creek
Molino Creek
New River
Oak Creek
Paria River
Puerco River
Rillito River
Rio de Flag
Sabino Creek
Salt River
San Carlos River
San Cristobal Wash
San Francisco River
San Pedro River
San Simon River
Santa Cruz River
Santa Maria River
Silver Creek
Sonoita Creek
Tapeats Creek
Tenmile Wash
Thunder River
Tonto Creek
Verde River
Virgin River
White River
Zuni River

See also
List of mountain ranges of Arizona
List of rivers of the United States
List of valleys of Arizona

References
USGS Geographic Names Information Service
USGS Hydrologic Unit Map - State of Arizona (1974)

Arizona
Rivers
.
.
.